Adi Nes (born 1966) is an Israeli photographer.

Education 
 1989-1992 Bezalel Academy of Arts and Design, Jerusalem, photography

Life and career
Adi Nes was born in Kiryat Gat. His parents are Jewish immigrants from Iran. He is openly gay.

Nes is notable for series "Soldiers", in which he mixes masculinity and homoerotic sexuality, depicting Israeli soldiers in a fragile way.  In 2003 he did a feature for Vogue Hommes. Nes has given solo exhibitions at the Wexner Center for the Arts, Legion of Honor in San Francisco, the Tel Aviv Museum of Art, the Museum of Contemporary Art in San Diego, and the Melkweg Gallery in Amsterdam, among others. His work has also shown in group exhibitions at the Hotel de Sully in Paris, Haifa Museum of Art and the Jewish Museum in New York, among many others. He has been reviewed in The New York Times, the Financial Times, and others. In 2005 Nes was chosen as an outstanding artist of the prestigious Israel Cultural Excellence Foundation.

Nes' most famous piece recalls Leonardo da Vinci's The Last Supper, replacing the characters with young male Israeli soldiers. A print sold at auction in Sotheby's for $102,000 in 2005, and another for $264,000 in 2007.  The work appeared on the front page of The New York Times in May, 2008.

Nes' early work has been characterized as subverting the stereotype of the masculine Israeli man by using homoeroticism and sleeping, vulnerable figures. He regularly uses dark-skinned Israeli models.  The models' poses often evoke the Baroque period. Nes has said that the inspiration for his photography is partially autobiographical:

Nes lives and works in Tel Aviv. His work is currently sold through Jack Shainman Gallery in New York City and Praz-Delavallade in Paris and Los Angeles. In January 2007, he premiered a new series echoing Biblical stories.

Awards and prizes

 1993 Ministry of Education Council for Prize for Completion of Work, Ministry of Culture and Education
 1993 Sandra Jacobs Scholarship for Documentary in London
 1999 The Minister of Education, Culture and Sport Prize, The Ministry of Education, Culture and Sport
 2000 Nathan Gottesdiener Foundation, The Israeli Art Prize, Tel Aviv Museum of Art, Tel Aviv
 2003 The Constantiner Photographer Award for an Israeli Artist, Tel Aviv Museum of Art
 2005 The Fund for Excellence in Fine Arts

Gallery

References

General references
Gal, Nissim1. 2010. "The Language of the Poor: Bible Stories as a Critical Narrative of the Present." Images: Journal of Jewish Art & Visual Culture 4, no. 1: 82-108. Art & Architecture Source, March 27, 2017.

External links 

 Adi Nes - Artist page at the Sommer Contemporary Art Gallery Website
 Nes' Vogue Hommes (Prisoners) series
 Adi Nes Biblical Stories by Bill Horrigan, Wexner Center for the Arts
 Monograph from Museum of Contemporary Art, San Diego
 An Interview with Adi Nes by Jess T. Dugan, Big Red & Shiny

Israeli photographers
Gay photographers
Israeli people of Iranian-Jewish descent
Gay Jews
Israeli gay artists
Israeli LGBT photographers
Living people
1966 births
People from Kiryat Gat
Israeli Mizrahi Jews
21st-century LGBT people